Bar Yehuda is a Hebrew language surname

Bar Yehuda may also refer to:

Bar Yehuda Airfield , Israel
 or  Bar-Yehuda Road
, Tel Aviv, Israel

See also
Ben Yehuda (disambiguation)